Sans Souci is the sixth studio album by Australian punk band Frenzal Rhomb. It was released by Epitaph Records in Australia in April 2003 and Fat Wreck Chords elsewhere around the world.

Track listing

This album has many samples from the 2000 documentary film Cunnamulla about the outback town of Cunnamulla, Queensland.

The album's cover artwork features a photograph of drummer Gordy Forman's father Jimmy, and the booklet features other photos of Forman's family from the 1970s and 80s.

Initial pressings of the Australian album came with a bonus DVD with some live footage and three film clips.

An alternative version of Cocksucker appears on the Uncontrollable Fatulence compilation released in 2002.

Charts

References

2003 albums
Frenzal Rhomb albums
Epitaph Records albums
Fat Wreck Chords albums
Albums produced by Eddie Ashworth